Robert Foyers (22 June 1868 – 16 August 1942) was a Scottish footballer who played as a full-back. He played professionally for various clubs in Scotland and for Newcastle United in England, and was capped for Scotland at Junior and Senior levels.

Career
Born in Hamilton, Foyers joined local Junior side Burnbank Swifts from Palace Colliery and won back to back Scottish Junior Cup titles in 1889 and 1890. He was also one of four Swifts players to play in the first ever Scottish Junior international fixture against England on 11 May 1889.

After initially stepping up to Edinburgh club Heart of Midlothian in 1890, it was after switching to St Bernard's that Foyers' form earned him firstly a representative appearance for the Scottish Football Alliance XI against the rival Scottish Football League in 1892, followed by two caps for Scotland, both against Wales, in 1893 and 1894. He also lifted the Scottish Cup as St Bernard's defeated Renton in the 1894–95 final.

Foyers signed for Newcastle United in 1895 for a fee of £100 and was appointed club captain, but was disciplined for off-field behaviour and left soon afterwards. He returned to St Bernard's in 1897 before ending his career with short spells at Clyde and Hamilton Academical.

A mechanical engineer to trade, Foyers died in August 1942 at the age of 74.

References

1868 births
Footballers from Hamilton, South Lanarkshire
1942 deaths
Scottish footballers
St Bernard's F.C. players
Heart of Midlothian F.C. players
Newcastle United F.C. players
Hamilton Academical F.C. players
Clyde F.C. players
Scottish Football League players
English Football League players
Association football fullbacks
Scotland international footballers
Scottish Junior Football Association players
Place of death missing
Burnbank Athletic F.C. players
Scotland junior international footballers